Cigaritis seliga, the large long-banded silverline, is a butterfly in the family Lycaenidae. It was described by Hans Fruhstorfer in 1912. It is found in the Indomalayan realm.

Subspecies
Cigaritis seliga seliga (Peninsular Malaysia, southern Burma, southern Thailand)
Cigaritis seliga rokana (Fruhstorfer, 1912) (Borneo)

References

External links
Cigaritis at Markku Savela's Lepidoptera and Some Other Life Forms

Cigaritis
Butterflies described in 1912